USS Lorain (PF-97) was a United States Navy  authorized for construction during World War II but cancelled before construction could begin.

Lorain originally was authorized as a patrol gunboat named USS Vallejo with the hull number PG-205, but she was redesignated as a patrol frigate with the hull number PF-97 on 15 April 1943.  She was renamed USS Lorain on 19 November 1943.

Plans called for Lorain to be built under a Maritime Commission contract by the American Shipbuilding Company at Lorain, Ohio, as a Maritime Commission Type T. S2-S2-AQ1 hull. However, the contract for her construction for the U.S. Navy was cancelled on 11 February 1944 prior to the laying of her keel.

On 7 February 1944, four days before Lorains cancellation, her incomplete sister ship, the Tacoma-class patrol frigate USS Roanoke (PF-93) was renamed USS Lorain (PF-93).

References 

 NavSource Online Frigate (PF) Index
 

Tacoma-class frigates
Cancelled ships of the United States Navy
Lorain, Ohio